Al Aan or Alaan TV is a pan-Arab infotainment satellite television station based in Dubai Media City, United Arab Emirates.

History and Profile
Al Aan broadcasts from Dubai Media City.

Al Aan TV is free-to-air at Arabsat and Nilesat, mobile phones, radio and smartphone applications.

In 2019-2020, Jenan Moussa, a roving reporter covering the Syrian Civil War and other major stories for Al Aan TV, succeeded in getting phone content of top German ISIL widow Omaima Abdi, including thousands of pictures showing her carrying a gun and  also her husband Deso Dogg. She returned to Hamburg and was living as if nothing happened. As a result of Jenan’s effort, Omaima Abdi was sentenced to three years and six months imprisonment.

The channel came into the spotlight when it aired a rare video of a woman being stoned to death by Taliban in Orakzai Agency Pakistan.

Al Aan TV was the only TV station in the world to film and report  the funeral of former Libyan leader Muammar Gaddafi after his death in the 2011 Libyan civil war.

Akhbar Al Aan 
Al Aan presents a set of news programs, covering the Arab and international news, around the clock, including: reports, opinions and analysis of experts, culture, sport, economy and communities’ affairs in addition to special segments for journalism to reveal local issues and serious cases.

Al Aan TV has a network of reporters distributed around the Arab World, among them is the reporter and journalist Jenan Moussa.

Logos 
The old logo was replaced with the new one on 1 October 2021:

 New logo:
 Old logo:

References

External links

2006 establishments in the United Arab Emirates
Arabic-language television stations
24-hour television news channels
Free-to-air
Television stations in Dubai
Television channels and stations established in 2006
Foreign television channels broadcasting in the United Kingdom